Arturo José Ramírez Álvarez (born 19 April 1991 in San Juan de los Morros) is a Venezuelan sprinter. He competed in the 4 × 400 m relay event at the 2012 Summer Olympics and 2016 Summer Olympics.

Personal bests
100 m: 10.41 s A (wind: +0.4 m/s) –  Xalapa, 24 November 2014
200 m: 20.67 s (wind: -1.0 m/s) –  Santiago, 15 March 2014
400 m: 45.84 s –  Barquisimeto, 8 June 2012

International competitions

References

External links

1991 births
Living people
Venezuelan male sprinters
Olympic athletes of Venezuela
Athletes (track and field) at the 2012 Summer Olympics
Athletes (track and field) at the 2016 Summer Olympics
World Athletics Championships athletes for Venezuela
People from Guárico
Athletes (track and field) at the 2011 Pan American Games
Athletes (track and field) at the 2015 Pan American Games
Pan American Games medalists in athletics (track and field)
Pan American Games bronze medalists for Venezuela
Athletes (track and field) at the 2018 South American Games
South American Games gold medalists for Venezuela
South American Games silver medalists for Venezuela
South American Games bronze medalists for Venezuela
South American Games medalists in athletics
Central American and Caribbean Games bronze medalists for Venezuela
Competitors at the 2014 Central American and Caribbean Games
Competitors at the 2018 Central American and Caribbean Games
Central American and Caribbean Games medalists in athletics
Medalists at the 2011 Pan American Games
20th-century Venezuelan people
21st-century Venezuelan people